Natalya Vyacheslavina Sumska (born April 22, 1956) is a Ukrainian actress of theater and cinema, television hostess, recipient of the Shevchenko National Prize in 2008 and the People's Artist of Ukraine (2000).

Biography

Sumska was born on April 22, 1956 in the village of Katyuzhanka, Kyiv Oblast into a family of hereditary actors. Her father was the People's Artist of Ukraine (1981), Vyacheslav Hnatovych Sumsky and her mother - the Merited Artist of Ukraine, Hanna Opanasenko-Sumska. Until Natliya was 10, she lived in Lviv Oblast. In 1977 Sumska finished the Kyiv State Institute of Theatrical Arts of Karpenko-Karyi. The same year she became an actress at the Franko National Academical Drama Theater.

In 2000 she became a laureate of the national theater award "Kyiv pectoral" (for her role of Masha in the Chekhov's Three sisters).

Since 2003 simultaneously works for Inter TV Networks. There she led a talk-show Key moment which was discontinued by Inter in 2010.

In 2008 Sumska received Shevchenko National Prize and was named the Kyivan of the Year.

Works in the theater company "Benyuk and Hostikoyev".

He is a member of the Taras Shevchenko National Prize Committee of Ukraine (since December 2016).

Personal life
Natalya Sumska has one younger sister Olha, who is also an actress.

Natalya Sumska is married to a fellow actor with whom she a daughter and a son.

Plays
 Eneyida (Kotliarevsky) as Didona
 Vassa Zhelieznova (Gorky) as Liudmila
 White Crow (Rybchynsky) as Joan D'Arc
 Blez (Manye) as Mari
 Senior from higher world as Fiorella and Matilda
 Kin IV as Anna
 Pygmalion as Eliza Doolittle

Movies
 Karmeliuk as Maria
 Natalka Poltavka as Natalka
 The Mountains are Smoking as Marichka
 For home fire as Yulia Shablynska
 Dudaryks as Khrystyna
 State Border as Maria

References

External links 
 Profile on Inter
 Interview to ladyjob.com.ua
 Sumska as a guest at the National Radio Company in Ukraine
 Sumska gives a press-conference in Kremenchuk (April 2010).
 Review of a play Senior from a higher world in Vinnytsia February 2004 
 Interview to newspaper Simya

Living people
1956 births
Ukrainian film actresses
Ukrainian television presenters
Ukrainian stage actresses
20th-century Ukrainian actresses
Inter (TV channel) people
Recipients of the title of People's Artists of Ukraine
Recipients of the Shevchenko National Prize
Kyiv National I. K. Karpenko-Kary Theatre, Cinema and Television University alumni
People from Kyiv Oblast
Ukrainian women television presenters